Qadi Mahalleh may refer to:
 Qadi Mahalleh, Amol
 Qadi Mahalleh, Babolsar
 Qadi Mahalleh, Juybar